The Ahir Yadav Kshatriya Mahasabha (AYKM) is an organization of the Yadav caste, founded in Rewari, British India, in 1910 by Rao Balbir Singh.

The association claimed that the Ahirs were originally known as Yadavs (see Yadava), and descended from the Yadu dynasty, to which Krishna belonged. It claimed a Kshatriya status for the caste, relying on colonial British ethnographers who described the Ahirs as related to the ancient Abhiras. The association promoted the caste unity by promoting the members of the caste to downplay endogamous subdivisions.

References

Organizations established in 1910
1910 in India
Ahir
Kshatriya